Gibraltar Secondary School is a public school in the unincorporated community of Fish Creek, Town of Gibraltar, Door County, Wisconsin, United States. It serves grades 6-12 and is a part of the Gibraltar Area Schools.

It used to be known as Gibraltar High School and served grades 9 through 12.

History
The school was founded in 1917, when the townspeople decided to establish the first high school in the county outside Sturgeon Bay.

Overview
Gibraltar Secondary School is part of the Gibraltar Area School District, and draws students from Gills Rock, Ellison Bay, Sister Bay, Ephraim, Fish Creek, Egg Harbor, and Baileys Harbor. The student-teacher ratio is 11:1.

Student body
Of the 198 students in 2011, 52% were female, and 5% were minorities.

From 2000 to 2019, high school enrollment (grades 9–12) declined 17.6%. Enrollment of students younger than high school declined 21.3%. The drop in middle school enrollment between the school years starting in 2013 and 2014 reflects the enrollment for grade 6 being taken from the middle school and added to the elementary school starting in 2014. This also boosted the elementary school enrollment during the same period.

Curriculum
The school offers Advanced Placement courses; 49% of the students are enrolled in at least one of these courses. Gibraltar offers a heavy focus in the 4 A's (Arts, Athletics, Academics, Activities

Sports
The school's mascot is the Viking, the school colors are blue and gold, and teams compete in the Packerland Conference.

In 1940, the Gibraltar High School boys' basketball team won the peninsula championship. In 1971, the school's ski team finished second in the state competition.

See also
Door County, Wisconsin § Declining public school enrollment

References

External links
 

Public schools in Wisconsin
Schools in Door County, Wisconsin
Educational institutions established in 1917
1917 establishments in Wisconsin